The women's 5000 metres event at the 2003 Summer Universiade was held on 29 August in Daegu, South Korea.

Results

References
Results

Athletics at the 2003 Summer Universiade
2003 in women's athletics
2003